Pseudoruegeria marinistellae is a Gram-negative, rod-shaped, facultatively anaerobic and non-motile bacterium from the genus of Pseudoruegeria which has been isolated from a starfish from Sanya in China.

References 

Rhodobacteraceae
Bacteria described in 2017